Nedbaylo or Nedbailo (Недбайло) is a Ukrainian-language surname. It may refer to:

Anatoly Nedbaylo, Soviet World War II pilot, twice Hero of the Soviet Union
Tatiana Nedbaylo, Kyrgyz gymnast
Petr Emelyanovich Nedbailo, a 1968 recipient of the United Nations Prize in the Field of Human Rights

Ukrainian-language surnames